The 1939 Australian Grand Prix was a motor race held on the Lobethal Circuit in South Australia, Australia on 2 January 1939. The race was staged over 17 laps of the 14 kilometre circuit, the longest ever used for the Grand Prix, for a race distance of 241 kilometres. The Grand Prix meeting was organised by Lobethal Carnivals Ltd. and the Sporting Car Club of South Australia.

The race was the eleventh Australian Grand Prix and the second since the 1938 revival of the event. The Lobethal Circuit comprised three country roads in a roughly triangular formation, passing through the town of Lobethal and the nearby village of Charleston. The advantage of using these country roads was that, for the first time, the Grand Prix was held on a bitumen sealed surface instead of on dirt roads. The race utilised a handicap start with the slowest cars starting first and the fastest cars last, the winner being the first to complete the stipulated number of laps. Trophies were awarded for the first three places with prize money paid to the first seven finishers. Prize money and a trophy were also awarded for Fastest Time.

The race was won by relatively unknown Western Australian racer Allan Tomlinson driving a supercharged MG T. Bob Lea-Wright's Terraplane Special finished in second position ahead of Jack Phillips' Ford Special. The winning car's average speed was the fastest of any Australian Grand Prix prior to 1956, with Tomlinson averaging 84.00 mph. The fastest actual time over the race distance was recorded by Jack Saywell driving an Alfa Romeo.

The entry of J O'Dea crashed at the Gumeracha turn late in the race and driver Vern Leech was killed almost instantaneously.

Later in 1939, Australia would declare war on the AXIS powers. As World War II enveloped Australia, motor racing wound down and would not resume until the mid-1940s. The Australian Grand Prix itself would be revived in 1947.

Classification 

Results as follows.

Notes
 Fastest time: Jack Saywell: 1:45.48
 Fastest race lap: Alf Barrett: 5:40s: 93.52 mph 
 Raymond Curlewis was entered to drive an MG N Type in the Grand Prix but, having suffered a rollover in a supporting race, competed in the Grand Prix in an MG TB.

References

External links
 
 Racing History Of Lobethal - 2008 Documentary (including 1939 Australian Grand Prix footage), vimeo.com

Grand Prix
Australian Grand Prix
Motorsport at Lobethal
Australian Grand Prix